The Ski Museum of Maine in Kingfield, Maine, United States, is devoted to preserving and presenting the history and heritage of skiing. The museum has an emphasis on artifacts and documents relating to the state of Maine. In 2009, the museum relocated from Farmington to Kingfield.

The club's collection includes approximately three dozen pairs of Maine-made skis that date from the early 20th century, numerous examples of leather ski boots and a variety of accessories.

The museum began informally in 1995 when several members of the Sugarloaf Ski Club were cleaning out the organization's files from the 1950s through 1970s. Lacking space to store the material, and reluctant to destroy it, they suggested creating a museum as a permanent repository.

Several thousand Sugarloaf Ski Club documents formed the original nucleus of the archives. Many of these relate to the founding and early years of Sugarloaf, the state's second busiest ski resort. Another valuable collection of records and newspaper clippings was donated by Walter Melvin; these document several clubs and ski areas in the Bangor area from the 1930s through the 1960s.

The club's collection also includes documents and memorabilia from defunct ski areas such as Big A, in York, and Enchanted Mountain, south of Jackman.

The organization was incorporated in 1999, and in December, 2006, opened its first public exhibit in leased space at 109 Church Street in downtown Farmington: a collection of Maine-made ski equipment, including skis, boots and accessories.

Many of these items were borrowed from the personal collection of Glenn Parkinson, a member of the museum's board of directors and the author of First Tracks, a book that relates stories from the first 75 years of skiing in Maine. Donations of additional items and documents have been arriving weekly since the museum opened.

In early 2009 the museum completed the acquisition of a set of miniature skis that were crafted circa 1905 in Portland, Maine, by Theo A. Johnsen and used by him as a marketing tool for his Tajco brand ski equipment.

Other museum activities include an online archive of vintage photographs, published in cooperation with the Maine Memory Network, a website of the Maine Historical Society.

During the 2008–2009 ski season, the museum inaugurated a series of "Fireside Chats," narrated digital slideshows the depict the history and heritage of Maine skiing from 1870 to the present.

Maine Ski Hall of Fame
The museum includes the Maine Ski Hall of Fame, which currently honors 39 Mainers who have made substantial contributions to the sport, both statewide and nationally.

External links
Ski Museum of Maine website
"Skiing Pleasant Mountain" exhibit at Maine Memory Network.
Associated Press article by Glenn Adams in USA Today.
Ski Tracks article by Dan Cassidy in Maine Coast Now.

Ski museums and halls of fame
Ski areas and resorts in Maine
Sports museums in Maine
Museums in Franklin County, Maine
Museums established in 1999
1999 establishments in Maine